Jesuit High School is a private, Catholic, college-preparatory school run by the USA West Province of the Society of Jesus in Beaverton outside Portland, Oregon, United States, in the Archdiocese of Portland. It was founded by the Jesuits in 1956 and uses a Jesuit, college-preparatory curriculum. It is coeducational and enrolls approximately 1,300 students of all faiths.

History

The school was the 43rd Jesuit High School to be established in the United States. Though it was not finally established until 1956, the process of founding a Jesuit High School in Portland began in 1907, when property was purchased by the parish of St. Ignatius and set aside for a future High School. A lay appeal to the Jesuit Provincial for a High School in 1929 came to nothing. In 1954 the Holy Cross Fathers of Portland announced the closing of Columbia Prep and a plan for the Jesuits to take over the premises was discussed, but again dropped. Finally in 1955 the Jesuit Provincial Superior was asked by the Archbishop to set up a school. Hillsdale Dairy Farm, a  plot to the west, some 15 minutes drive from downtown Portland, was purchased for $165,000. Jesuit and Holy Cross priests raised pledges of $117,000 by Wednesday of the first week of a fund-raising campaign in churches, and hundreds of thousands more by door-to-door canvassing. Jesuit High School opened for freshmen boys on September 10, 1956 and girls have been admitted since 1993.

Demographics
The demographic breakdown of the 1,275 students enrolled in 2021-2022 was:
Native American/Alaskan - 0.3%
Black - 3.1%
Hispanic - 7.7%
Multiracial - 11.0%
Asian/Pacific islanders - 16.5%
White - 61.4%

For the 2021-2022 school year, 99% of the graduating senior class enrolled in college, 25% of the overall student body was receiving financial aid, and 68% of students identified as Catholic.

Academics
Since 1961, Jesuit High School has been accredited through Northwest Accreditation Commission and has also been ranked 3rd best overall school and 1st best Christian School. 

In 1989 and 1998, Jesuit High School was honored in the Blue Ribbon Schools Program, the highest honor a school can receive in the United States.

Sports
Jesuit won its first two athletic state championships in football in 1967 (tied) and 1968. Since then, Jesuit has amassed a total of 165 state titles across 25 different sports through the 2021-2022 school year. Its greatest successes have been in tennis, with a combined 37 titles between men (22) and women (15), and soccer with 29 combined titles (men - 15; women - 14).

On June 20, 2007, Sports Illustrated rated Jesuit the number one high school athletic program in the nation, citing success both on and off the field.

In 2016 and again in 2019, Jesuit was named the number one high school athletic program in the nation by MaxPreps.

Through the 2021-2022 school year, was a 27 time winner of the Oregon Athletic Coaches Association (OACA) All-Sports award in the division they competed in. In addition, Jesuit was awarded the Oregon School Activities Association (OSAA) Cup 17 times between the 1999-2000 and 2021-22 academic years, including a 9 year streak between the 2005 and 2013 and an ongoing 8 year streak since 2015.

Jesuit is currently an OSAA 6A classification school and competes in the 6A-2 Metro League.

State titles 
 Baseball: 2016, 2019
 Basketball (men): 1999, 2005, 2009, 2010, 2011, 2012, 2019
 Basketball (women): 2011
 Cross Country (men): 2000, 2002, 2004, 2008, 2017, 2021, 2022
 Cross Country (women): 1996, 1998, 1999, 2002, 2003, 2004, 2005, 2006, 2007, 2008, 2009, 2010, 2016, 2017, 2022
 Football: 1967 [co‐champion], 1968, 2000, 2005, 2006, 2015
 Golf (men): 1996, 1998, 2000, 2007, 2008, 2011, 2017, 2018, 2019
 Golf (women): 2004, 2005, 2018, 2019, 2022
 Soccer (men): 1986, 1987, 1988, 1991, 1992, 1993, 1994, 1999, 2000, 2001, 2005, 2010, 2012, 2013, 2018, 2022
 Soccer (women): 1994, 1995, 1996, 1997, 1998, 1999, 2001, 2002, 2009, 2010, 2015, 2017, 2018, 2019, 2022 
 Softball: 2006, 2016 
 Swimming (men): 2006, 2007, 2015, 2016, 2017, 2018, 2019, 2020, 2023 
 Swimming (women): 1996, 2002, 2009, 2010, 2011, 2012, 2013, 2016, 2019, 2020, 2023
 Tennis (men): 1974, 1975, 1976, 1978, 1979, 1980, 1983, 1984, 1998, 1999, 2000, 2008, 2009, 2010, 2011, 2012, 2013, 2014, 2016, 2017, 2018, 2019
 Tennis (women): 1994, 1995, 1996, 1997, 1998, 1999, 2002, 2005, 2006, 2007, 2008, 2009, 2012 2014, 2015
 Track and Field (men): 2006, 2013, 2014
 Track and Field (women): 2008, 2010, 2011, 2016, 2017, 2018
 Volleyball: 2004 2008, 2012, 2014, 2015, 2018, 2019

Playoffs were not played in Oregon high school sports and therefore no state champions were declared during the 2020-21 school year due to the COVID-19 pandemic.

Notable alumni
Mick Abel, 15th draft pick for the Philadelphia Phillies
Timothy Boyle (born 1949), CEO Columbia Sportswear
H. W. Brands, author, professor
Richard Brenneke, businessman
Pete Brock, former National Football League football player
Stan Brock, former NFL football player and coach
Xavier Coleman, NFL cornerback, New York Jets
Mike Dunleavy Jr., former NBA basketball player, current scout for the Golden State Warriors
Mike Hass, former football wide receiver
Travis Knight, animator
Owen Marecic, former NFL football fullback
Morgan Murphy, comedian
Stephen Holt, pro basketball player, currently a free agent 
Brian Michaelson, former basketball player for Gonzaga Bulldogs men's basketball, and current assistant coach for the Gonzaga Bulldogs men's basketball
Henry Mondeaux, NFL defensive end, Pittsburgh Steelers
Blake Nelson, author
David Norrie, college football announcer for ABC
Slade Norris, former NFL linebacker
Preston Parsons, former NFL football quarterback
Mike Remmers, NFL football offensive tackle, Kansas City Chiefs
 Ashwin Sah - mathematician working in combinatorics and Morgan Prize winner
Erik Spoelstra, championship winning NBA head coach of Miami Heat
Seth Tarver, basketball player, currently a free agent
Kyle Wiltjer, pro basketball player 
Leah Sottile, journalist
Chris Brown (soccer, born 1977), ex-MLS midfielder

References

Other sources
 Schoenberg, S.J., Wilfred P. Jesuits in Oregon, 1844-1959. The Oregon-Jesuit, 1959 (Centennial Year)

Educational institutions established in 1956
Jesuit high schools in the United States
Catholic secondary schools in Oregon
High schools in Washington County, Oregon
Education in Beaverton, Oregon
Schools accredited by the Northwest Accreditation Commission
Buildings and structures in Beaverton, Oregon
1956 establishments in Oregon
Roman Catholic Archdiocese of Portland in Oregon